The jazz album Toshiko Meets Her Old Pals was recorded by pianist Toshiko Akiyoshi in Tokyo in March 1961 and released by King Records in Japan.    All tracks from this album as well as 1961's Long Yellow Road (Trio) were later combined on a single album released by King Jazz as 1961 - Toshiko Akiyoshi, a History of King Jazz Recordings.

Track listing 
LP side A
"So What" (Davis) – 10:50 
"The Night Has a Thousand Eyes" (Brainin) – 5:00 
"Donna Lee" (Parker) – 5:50 
LP side B
"Quebec" (Mariano) – 6:17 
"Old Pals" (Akiyoshi) – 5:01 
"Watasu No Biethovin" (Akiyoshi) – 7:10

Personnel
Toshiko Akiyoshi – piano 
Sadao Watanabe – alto saxophone
Akira Miyazawa – tenor saxophone 
Masanaga Harada – bass (tracks A1, 2, B2, 3)
Hachiro Kurita – bass (tracks A3, B1)
Masahiko Togashi – drums (tracks A1, 2)
Hideo Shiraki – drums (tracks A3, B1)
Takeshi Inomata – drums (tracks B2, 3)

References / External links
[ Allmusic]
King SKC-3

1961 albums
Toshiko Akiyoshi albums
King Records (Japan) albums